NFL Fever 2000 is an American football video game published and developed by Microsoft Game Studios for Windows in 1999. The game was followed by NFL Fever 2002.

Reception

The game received favorable reviews according to the review aggregation website GameRankings.

It was nominated for Computer Gaming Worlds "Sports Game of the Year" award, which went to High Heat Baseball 2000.

References

1999 video games
Microsoft games
NFL Fever video games
North America-exclusive video games
Video games developed in the United States
Video games set in 2000
Windows games
Windows-only games